The 1927 Grand Prix season was the third (and final) AIACR World Manufacturers' Championship season and the second run to a 1.5-litre engine limit. In a dominant display, the championship was won by Delage, with team driver Robert Benoist winning four of the five Grand Prix.

The championship opened with the Indianapolis 500 – once again a contest between Duesenberg and Miller engines. Previous year's winner Frank Lockhart started on pole position and led for over half the race until his car suffered a broken con-rod. Rookie George Souders, driving Peter DePaolo’s 1925 race-winning Duesenberg, came through and took a comfortable victory with an eight lap margin. DePaolo went on to secure the season's AAA Championship with three wins and four second places.

After major re-working over the close season to sort out the chronic exhaust and heating issues, the Delages proved unbeatable. They were the only manufacturer to enter the requisite three races to qualify for the championship. Bugatti and Talbot challenged them at the next Grand Prix, in France, but then the Talbot team was shut down. Three Americans, including Indy-winner George Souders, came over for the mandatory Italian round but their oval-track car-designs were unsuitable for European circuit-racing. The final round, the British Grand Prix attracted a bigger field, but once again Delage was able to romp to a dominating 1-2-3 victory. 

It was already readily apparent that the 1.5-litre formula was not attracting consistent manufacturer interest. The AIACR had stated, before the season started, that from 1928 it would not continue this racing format but instead run its Grands Prix to an open Formula Libre, as most other European races were already being done.

The season had opened with the advent of a new road-race across northern Italy – the Mille Miglia was a race for touring cars from Brescia to Rome and back. Ferdinando Minoia led home a triumphant 1-2-3 for OM. In a rain-affected Targa Florio, Emilio Materassi kept control to win for Bugatti. His success continued and he went on to be the winner of Italy's inaugural Driver's Championship. The other significant event of the racing year was the opening of a major new racetrack in Germany. The Nürburgring was over 30 km of winding road with 172 corners, situated near the Ardennes Forest just across the border from the Belgian Spa-Francorchamps circuit. The opening race in June was won by Rudolf Caracciola in a 6.8-litre Mercedes sports-car.

Manufacturers' World Championship
Sources: 

The Indianapolis 500 also counted towards the 1927 AAA Championship Car season held in the United States

Other Races
Major non-championship races are in bold
Sources: 

 
Note: *Race stopped because of crowd-invasion of track

Teams and drivers
These tables only intend to cover entries in the Championship Grands Prix and the major non-Championship races, as keyed above.
Sources:

Significant Privateer drivers

Note: * raced in event as a relief driver. Those in brackets show, although entered, the driver did not race

Regulations and Technical
The AIACR (forerunner of the FIA) kept with its 1.5-litre formula, despite the low manufacturer interest. The only modification to the regulations was that the minimum dry weight of the car was increased from 600 to 700kg. Although two seats were the usual, a single-seat was now also accepted if the seat was a minimum 80cm wide and 25cm high.
This year, the European Grand Prix was awarded back to the Italian Automobile Club. Once again, each team had to compete in at least three of the races, including the mandatory Italian Grand Prix to qualify for the championship. All races were supposed to be at least 600km long, however the Italian and British Grand Prix did not meet this, and there is no apparent explanation why. At its October 1926 meeting, the AIACR had faced its reality that the 1.5-litre formula had not worked. The committee therefore agreed that the current format would only extend for one more year, to be replaced in 1928 by an open engine regulation.

With the Targa Florio, the organisers reduced the classes to just three – up to 1100, to 1500 and over 1500. This put the 2-litre Bugattis in the same category as the bigger-engined Peugeot and Alfa Romeo. The 1100cc cars only ran three laps, while the rest did five laps (with a maximum of 9 hours). Two occupants were mandatory for all cars.
This year, as part of the ongoing stipulations from Peugeot who had won the Coppa Florio in 1925, that race was not held in conjunction with the Targa Florio. Instead, the Coppa was raced in France as a sports and touring car event.

Motorsport now started getting political. Italian leader Benito Mussolini, a keen follower of motor-racing, saw it as a propaganda advantage and an opportunity to enhance national prestige. So, this year the Italian Automobile Club set up its first national championship. It was to comprise twelve events, including the major races of the Italian and Rome Grands Prix and the Targa Florio, with a view of increasing competition and experience of Italian drivers. To promote Italian car manufacturers, a new event was organised – the Mille Miglia (“1000 Miles”). The concept planned by four wealthy gentlemen-drivers from Brescia, it was a race for touring and sports cars on public roads from Brescia to Rome and back and would soon become an iconic annual event.

Technical Innovation

Ettore Bugatti had a winning formula with his Type 35 chassis and its variants, and changed little over the close-season aside from fitting a larger supercharger to the Type 39A grand prix car. However, after the exhaust debacle of the previous year, Delage set about making fundamental changes to their car. The two superchargers replaced by a single one, while the engine block was reversed and offset from centre to move the exhaust away from the driver. The result was a greatly improved car.
 

The Maserati Brothers developed their first model, the Tipo 26, as the 26B with its supercharged straight-8 engine bored out to 2.0-litres. Fiat had retired from racing at the end of 1924. Yet in September, the astonishing new 806 model appeared at the Italian Grand Prix weekend. Designed by Carlo Cavalli and Tranquillo Zerbi, the V12 1.5-litre engine had two 6-cylinder engine-blocks mounted side by side on a common crankcase and geared together. With the valves driven by three overhead camshafts it could develop 185 bhp at 8500rpm. The engine unit itself was offset to the left with the driver in the right-hand seat and the fuel-tank beside him. The low profile gave it a blistering top speed of 250 km/h, easily 40 km/h faster than any of the current competition. That it only ever competed in one race left many commentators wondering what might have been.

In the US, Harry Miller continued developing his supercharged 1.5-litre engines. Bred for the oval tracks, his sleek single-seater was now putting out an incredible 230 bhp running on alcohol fuel – making it easily the most powerful racing engine across the world.
During the year Eddie Rickenbacker, decorated war-hero and former racing driver, bought the Indianapolis Motor Speedway from Carl Fisher and Jim Allison for $700 000.

On 29 March, Henry Segrave became the first man to break the 200 mph land speed barrier in a Sunbeam 1000 hp Slug. Called Mystery, the car was powered by two 22-litre V12 aircraft engines.

Season review

The Italian road-races
A new event in March started the racing season. Four young gentleman-drivers (including Conte Aymo Maggi and Franco Mazzotti), wanting to restore Brescia's former pre-eminence in Italian motorsport, put a proposal to the government for a national road-race that was promptly approved. The race for touring and sports-cars harked back to the city-to-city races from the turn of the century. Called the Mille Miglia, as it covered a non-stop run across one thousand miles of public roads. It ran from Brescia to Rome via Bologna, before crossing the Apennines to Ancona and back to Brescia via Ferrara, Padua and Vicenza. It attracted many of the top Italian drivers and captured the imagination of country. Aymo Maggi himself, driving an Isotta Fraschini with Alfieri Maserati, was the first away at 8am as the largest car in the field. Although Gastone Brilli-Peri in his Alfa Romeo led into Rome, after 21 hours, it was Ferdinando Minoia who arrived at Brescia first. In OM's finest hour, their cars finished 1-2-3 in the inaugural race of this iconic event, made all the better as the cars were built in Brescia.

The Targa Florio, in April, was the opening round of the new Italian Championship. Peugeot and Bugatti returned to renew their rivalry. This year Peugeot only had a single 174 S 4-litre sports car for André Boillot. Former Targa winner Bartolomeo Costantini was now the Bugatti team manager and brought four cars.  Caberto Conelli had a 1.5-litre Type 37A, while the other drivers, veteran Jules Goux and Ferdinando Minoia, Emilio Materassi and liqueur-heir André Dubonnet, had the new 2-litre Type 35C. They were supported by a squadron of seven privateers making up half the field. In the absence of Fiat and Alfa Romeo, Italian honour would be upheld by Maserati. Alfieri Maserati drove the new Tipo 26B himself, while his brother Ernesto and Aymo Maggi had older Tipo26s.
As the initial car was a non-starter, the first car left at 8:04am. At the beginning Dubonnet and Boillot duelled for the lead. Conelli was first to arrive back at the line, but on elapsed time, Minoia had a five-second lead over Dubonnet with Materassi and female Czech driver Eliška Junková less than a minute behind. But going into the second lap, the order changed significantly. A third of the way around, Junková slid off the road when the steering rod broke. Soon after, Minoia retired with a broken universal joint and Dubonnet was having engine problems. Materassi set a new lap record opening a 6-minute lead over Maserati (who pitted with a flat tyre) and Conelli. Three Bugattis were fighting with the three Maseratis with Boillot's Peugeot in seventh. Rain started falling on the fourth lap making the roads treacherous, and causing several drivers to go off the road. But Materassi kept control throughout with he and Conelli getting a comfortable 1-2 victory for Bugatti, the third straight win for the team. Alfieri Maserati was twenty minutes back with Boillot in fourth, over fifty minutes behind the winner. Only six of the 22 starters were classified at the finish. Two weeks later, another race - the Coppa Messina - was held on the mountain roads of Sicily. Materassi crashed his Bugatti in practice but bought one of the works Maseratis to race instead. A Bugatti won again, but Alfieri Maserati was severely injured when he crashed, blinded by dust, overtaking two other cars. Several major newspapers mistakenly reported his death, however he did slowly recover despite losing a kidney.

Indianapolis
Once again, the Indianapolis 500 would be a two-way contest between Duesenberg and Miller. All cars had either of those two engines. Harry Miller had dramatically developed his engine to an impressive 230 bhp. Rookie Charles ‘Dutch’ Bauman drove the works car, while a number of customer teams backed them up with experienced drivers like previous winners Frank Lockhart and Peter DePaolo, as well as Ralph Hepburn, Leon Duray, Harry Hartz and Eddie Hearne. The Duesenberg brothers had three works cars for Wade Morton and rookies Babe Stapp and Benny Shoaff. Another ten rookies started this year's race including Wilbur Shaw, Louis Schneider, Cliff Bergere and Fred Frame. Two-time winner Tommy Milton had been working on Cliff Durant’s new Detroit-Miller Special, and when the latter was too ill to race, Milton qualified the car. Former racer and champion Earl Cooper built four Miller-powered front-wheel drive specials, sponsored by the Buick Motor Company. His drivers were Bennett Hill, Peter Kreis, Bob McDonogh and Jules Ellingboe.

In qualifying, the 1927 winner Frank Lockhart set a new lap record of 120.9 mph. Joining him on the front row were DePaolo and Duray. Lockhart dominated the race for 120 laps until he was put out by a broken con-rod. In a race of attrition only ten cars were flagged. Rookie George Souders drove a reliable race in his Duesenberg and came through for the victory. It was the same car that Peter DePaolo had won with in 1925 although Souders had denied that at the time. Duesenberg was in line for a 1-2 finish until, with two laps to go, the rear gearing broke on Babe Stapp’s car that he was running relief for Benny Shoaff. Earl Devore inherited second place, finishing 12 minutes (effectively 8 laps) behind Souders. It was the largest winning margin since 1913 and Souders was the first driver to win the race without the help of a relief driver or a riding mechanic. There were several major incidents in the race. On lap 24, Norman Batten’s Miller caught fire. The driver stood up in his seat to drive it away from the pits to safety before jumping out. Soon after Jules Ellingboe was seriously injured when his car crashed into the wall and rolled.

In an abbreviated season of only 11 races, the 1927 AAA championship was won for the second time by Pete DePaolo, with 3 wins and 4 seconds. That consistency was better than second-placed Frank Lockhart's 4 wins alone.
In 1926, after his mathematical work for college football, Professor Frank G. Dickinson at the University of Illinois developed a points system for the AAA. The 1927 championship used that, and the AAA retroactively calculated it on the previous seasons’ results going back to 1909 that would be published in their February 1929 bulletin.

The Championship in Europe
The start of the European leg of the World Championship was the French Grand Prix, held at Montlhéry. Ten cars were entered, from four manufacturers. Bugatti had their drivers from the Targa Florio – Materassi, Conelli and Dubonnet. The Delage cars had been considerably revised and upgraded over the close-season. The team drivers were Robert Benoist, Edmond Bourlier and André Morel. The third trio was the Talbot team of Albert Divo, veteran Louis Wagner and William Grover-Williams. The final entry was the Halford Special, recently sold by Frank Halford to George Eyston.
Earlier in the weekend, Divo had won the Course de Formula Libre in his Talbot, while Wagner and Williams raced Sunbeams but retired. After race-practice, Ettore Bugatti withdrew his team saying his cars were too uncompetitive, much to the anger of the big French crowd. Despite that, there was a close race with Divo leading Benoist and Williams at the end of the first lap. Wagner's Talbot had been left on the start line, unwilling to start, and he lost five minutes getting going. On the fourth lap Benoist and Williams both passed Divo, taking turns setting the fastest lap. But when Williams joined Morel and Eyston in the pits with engine issues, Benoist was able to open up a 2-minute lead over Divo.
Just before the halfway point, Divo retired with a failed supercharger and the Talbot challenge was blunted with Wagner now a lap behind. While all the other cars had assorted issues, Benoist kept circulating at a rapid pace.
Benoist ran away to lead a 1-2-3 victory for Delage. After the French Grand Prix, Louis Wagner announced his retirement. After a notable career, he was the last active driver from the original 1906 Grand Prix.

By the time of the next Grand Prix, in Spain, Talbot had withdrawn from motor-racing with the company facing an uncertain financial future. Bugatti did arrive to contest the race with Delage. The seventh and final starter was local Bilbao driver José Joaquín Palacio driving a Maserati Tipo 26. At noon, from a rolling start, Benoist took the lead. Palacio's Maserati was immediately in trouble and out of the race. Benoist and Materassi pulled away from the others, over a minute behind by lap 5. Materassi lost a minute when he skidded at a corner and bumped a wall, but pitted early to refuel to get him to the end of the race. At halfway Benoist had his fuel stop and came out less than a minute ahead of Materassi. Conelli was a further minute behind for Bugatti, now well ahead of Louis Chiron (reserve driver for Dubonnet) and Bourlier.
When Benoist had to stop again five laps later to change spark plugs, Materassi took the lead. When he then stopped to change a wheel, Materassi came out barely a car-length ahead of Benoist. They duelled back and forth for thirty minutes until Materassi cut a corner too tight, went off the road and hit another wall. Although uninjured, this time his car's suspension was too damaged to continue. Benoist only narrowly missed both the Bugatti and a quarry-wagon. Chiron crashed with four laps to go, and was fortunate not to get a serious head injury as he had chosen to wear a hard crash-helmet. These left only three cars in the race, leaving Benoist to take another comfortable victory, ahead of Conelli's Bugatti, and teammate Bourlier's Delage.

Bugatti failed to show, once again, at the nominally mandatory Italian Grand Prix. Fiat withdrew their entries for Pietro Bordino and Carlo Salamano, citing that the new cars were untested over a grand prix distance. But the Americans returned after a year away, with Indianapolis-winner George Souders in his Duesenberg, and Earl Cooper and Peter Kreis in front-wheel-drive Cooper-Millers. Delage confidence was such that only Benoist was entered. The American cars were designed for oval-racing and unsuited to the European road-courses. Compared to the five-speed gearboxes of the Delage, the Miller (used to rolling starts) only employed a two-speed gearing. It was ironic, that even though there were only six starters, the race had more manufacturers represented than in any GP race of the 2-year 1.5-litre formula.

The race started in pouring rain, with Benoist jumping into the lead followed by Souders and Minoia. Cooper and Kreis crawled off the line and Morandi's OM would not start. The American cars were very disappointing: Kreis’ Miller did not finish the first lap, retiring with a broken crankshaft. Souders was running in second until he had to retire a dozen laps with rainwater in his fuel. Cooper was finding his car almost undriveable in the wet weather and stopped soon after to be relieved by Kreis. Meanwhile, Benoist had established his dominance, having lapped the field after ten laps and holding a 15-minute lead after thirty (300km). Benoist went on to win by over 20 minutes (4 laps) back to Morandi. Kreis had driven hard  and was able to get up to pass Minoia for third on the last lap.

The British Grand Prix at Brooklands would be another Delage-Bugatti contest. This last race of the 1.5-litre formula provided the biggest entry list of any of the European rounds. Souders’ Duesenberg and the Fiats withdrew. The Bugatti team were Materassi, Conelli and Chiron. Delage's cars were driven by Benoist and Bourlier. Albert Divo was hired by Delage after the Talbot team was folded. British car company Alvis entered its latest front-wheel drive Grand Prix car for regular team driver Maurice Harvey. There were also three privateer Bugattis run by Malcolm Campbell, George Eyston and the Parisian-resident Romanian Prince Gheorghe Ghica-Cantacuzino. The final entrants were two Thomas Specials driven by Harold Purdy and William “Bomber” Scott. They were built by J.G. Parry-Thomas, based on the Leyland Eight luxury saloon chassis. The cars had been sold after Parry-Thomas was killed earlier in the year making a Land Speed Record attempt at Pendine Sands. For the sake of the neighbouring farms and houses, all the cars had to be fitted with noise-reducing exhaust mufflers.

The Saturday was cold and wet. In the morning, Harvey's Alvis broke its oil-pump and could not take the start. The remaining eleven cars could be lined up in a single row across the wide Railway Straight. In the heavy rain, Bourlier could not start his Delage, leaving his mechanics working on the car as the flag dropped. Materassi jumped into the lead, yet by the second lap, Bourlier had caught up and taken the lead. After only ten of the 125 laps both Thomas cars had dropped out and Eyston was having the first of many stops for sparkplugs. The Delage team had taken control, with Divo leading Bourlier and Benoist. Around the halfway point, most drivers stopped to refuel but Conelli, running in fourth, ran out of petrol and spent half an hour pushing his car back to the pits in the lashing rain. Chiron inherited his place but was already six laps behind the leader. Louis Delage issued team orders for his cars to finish in numerical order, which by opportune pit-stops was what happened - with Benoist winning from Bourlier and Divo. Chiron finished the 125 laps nearly half an hour later, and Materassi was flagged off still a further seven laps back.

The British drivers returned to Brooklands a fortnight later, in much better weather, for the JCC 200-miles.  Campbell and Eyston both ran Bugatti T39As and had a terrific duel for the first half of the race until Eyston retired. This left Campbell to run away with a victory.

The other races and a single flash from Fiat
Throughout the year, a number of races had promising fields but then many drivers and teams would fail to show up for raceday. This frustrated the spectators, and early on in the season at the Provence Grand Prix, held at the Miramas oval, they expressed their displeasure. Heavy rain in the morning had delayed the qualifying races, then in the warm-up for the final, Robert Benoist crashed his Delage into two other cars forming up on the grid. Bruised and with a damaged car, he could not take the start. When the Talbot team then withdrew from the final, the crowd's disappointment turned to anger. With inadequate communication and security from the organisers, spectators starting spilling onto the track by the third lap. Some drivers kept racing, until the race had to be flagged after the fifth lap when Chiron was in the lead. People got to the Talbot pit and vandalised the cars, forcing Divo and Moriceau to make a hasty exit. After this fiasco, the organising company soon went bankrupt and the circuit fell into disuse. The Marne Grand Prix, held just after the French GP, was a win for Bugatti to a future star: Philippe Etancelin.

The San Sebastián Grand Prix was held the week before the Spanish Grand Prix. Both were held on the 17km Lasarte road circuit in the Basque country of Spain. Run to Formula Libre rules, a big field of 34 was whittled down to 17 starters mainly of 2-litre Bugattis and 1.1-litre voiturettes. Emilio Materassi led home his three Bugatti works teammates leading from start to finish, with Charles Martin finishing almost an hour later in sixth in his works Amilcar, as the first voiturette home.
 

Throughout the year, the inaugural Italian Championship had attracted big fields of 20-30 cars and good crowds. The Rome Grand Prix, back on the calendar after a year's absence, was held in the city on a circuit just south of the River Tiber. It was significant as it gave future great racer Tazio Nuvolari his first major win in a car. Previously a motorcycle champion he, like many compatriots, were swapping over to four wheels. His skills in his regular Bugatti, not needing pit-stops, gave him victory over a number of more powerful supercharged Type 35s. Unfortunately, there were several bad crashes when cars went off the road into spectators. They included Materassi, who crashed his Itala special, killing a young boy.
Held on the same day as the Italian GP, the Milan Grand Prix saw the surprise appearance of a brand-new Fiat model. The 806 had a supercharged 1.5-litre engine, but Fiat chose not to enter it in World Championship race, despite its obvious power and speed. In a strange format, the 50km final would include the top-three finishers from three heats (divided by engine-class) along with the top-three placings after the fifth lap of the Italian GP. Unsurprisingly, after running a 4-hour, 500km Grand Prix, none of those three qualifiers (Benoist, Souders and Minoia) chose to then run in the Milan GP final. 

Despite a slow start, Pietro Bordino was able to bring that power to the fore to easily win the short race.

The new Nürburgring
The official opening of a major new racetrack in Germany happened in June. The Nürburgring was similar in concept to the 22km Solitudering near Stuttgart: a windy circuit in the hills centred around the local Nürburg castle, near Koblenz. It came from a project driven by the mayor of Cologne to draw tourism to the Ardennes area in the west, as well as creating work for many unemployed in the region. Despite a 2.2 km main straight, the track had 172 corners and comprised the main 23 km Nordschleife as well as the 8 km Sudschleife. The opening race used the combined track and was won by Rudolf Caracciola in a 6.8-litre Mercedes sports-car. A month later, the second German Grand Prix was held at the track. Held for sports cars again, it was won by Otto Merz in a similar car.
In Berlin, the AVUS circuit was modified with an intimidating 43 degree banking built on the Nordkurve.

Louis Delage had reportedly invested £36000 in improving his Grand Prix cars and announced his withdrawal from racing at the end of the season, selling the four cars. They continued to be very successful in voiturette racing well into the 1930s and beyond, last appearing in an F1 race in 1950. At Fiat, their pro-racing managing director, Guido Fornaca, died in January. The government-appointed board were shocked to discover the cost of developing the fantastic 806 and immediately closed down the racing department. They also ordered the 806, and earlier 804 and 805 models, destroyed instead of selling them to recover costs to a prospective queue of privateer racers. Italy's 1926 economic depression pushed many of the small manufacturers out of business.

After a successful season running his own Maserati 26, Itala 55 special and Bugatti 35, Emilio Materassi was declared the first winner of the new Italian national championship. With the shutdown of the Sunbeam-Talbot racing team, Materassi bought the three works Talbot 700s to start his own racing team, the first of its kind. In the United States, Tommy Milton, 1921 AAA champion and two-time Indianapolis winner retired, taking up an engineering position at Packard.  For Robert Benoist, with his unbeaten run in the World Championship, the reward was even greater – the president of France awarded him the country's highest honour, making him a Chevalier of the Légion d'Honneur.

The end of the season marked the end of the 1.5-litre formula. Increasing development costs and poor competition had conspired to discouraged manufacturers from entering. The next year would see an open engine limit, although the chassis weight minimum remained to ensure structural integrity and safety.

Championship final standings
The table lists the highest race position for each manufacturer. Only the best finishing car gained points for its manufacturer.
Note: To be eligible for the championship, manufacturers had to take part in three of the five Grand Prix including the Italian GP.
 * non-participation disqualified the manufacturer from the championship

Results of the season's major races

italics show the driver of the race's fastest lap. 
Only those drivers with a best finish of 6th or better are shown. Sources:

Citations

References
 Acerbi, Leonardo (2015) Mille Miglia – A race in pictures    Milan: Giorgio Nada Editorie  
 Cimarosti, Adriano (1997) The Complete History of Grand Prix Motor Racing    London: Aurum Press Ltd  
 Fondi, Pino (2006) Targa Florio: 20th Century Epic    Milan: Giorgio Nada Editore  
 Fox, Charles (1973) The Great Racing Cars & Drivers    London: Octopus Books Ltd  
 Georgano, Nick (1971) The Encyclopaedia of Motor Sport    London: Ebury Press Ltd  
 Higham, Peter (1995) The Guinness Guide to International Motor Racing    London: Guinness Publishing  
 Legate, Trevor (2006) 100 years of Grand Prix    Kent: Touchstone Books Ltd  
 Ludvigsen, Karl (2008) Racing Colours - Italian Racing Red    Surrey: Ian Allan Publishing Ltd  
 Monkhouse, George (1953) Grand Prix Racing Facts and Figures   London: G.T. Foulis & Co Ltd
 Montagna, Paolo (ed.) (1989) The Legendary Italian Grand Prix   Milan: A.C. Promotion
 Rendall, Ivan (1991) The Power and The Glory – A Century of Motor Racing    London: BBC Books  
 Rendall, Ivan (1993) The Chequered Flag – 100 years of Motor Racing    London: Weidenfeld & Nicolson Ltd  
 Venables, David (2009) Racing Colours - French Racing Blue    Surrey: Ian Allan Publishing Ltd

External links

  1927 Race Season – comprehensive race reports of most events, also listing entries and results. Retrieved 21 May 2020
  1927 World Championship – several detailed investigation articles about the first championship year. Retrieved 21 May 2020
  Grand Prix Winners 1895–1949 : History – Hans Etzrodt's description of the annual regulations, and changes. Retrieved 21 Apr 2020
  TeamDan  - list of the major races, entrants and results. Retrieved 21 May 2020
  SpeedFreaks  - list of the major races, entrants and results. Retrieved 21 May 2020
  6th Gear  - list of the major races and winners each year. Retrieved 21 May 2020
  MotorSport magazine – list of the year's races, entrants and results, by category. Retrieved 21 May 2020
  Grand Prix History – history of the Targa Florio race. Retrieved 21 May 2020
  La Targa Florio – race report and pictures of the Targa Florio. Retrieved 21 May 2020
  F2 Register – race results of the Targa Florio. Retrieved 21 May 2020
  Motorsport Memorial – motor-racing deaths by year. Retrieved 21 May 2020
  Racing Reference.com – list of all the AAA Championship results. Retrieved 21 May 2020
  ChampCar Stats – list of all the races, entrants and results of the AAA Championship. Retrieved 21 May 2020
  Indianapolis Motor Speedway.com – Indy 500 race results. Retrieved 21 May 2020

Grand Prix seasons
1927 in motorsport
 
1927 in American motorsport